Theodor Seuss Geisel (March 2, 1904 – September 24, 1991) was an American children's author and cartoonist. He is known for his work writing and illustrating more than 60 books under the pen name Dr. Seuss. His work includes many of the most popular children's books of all time, selling over 600 million copies and being translated into more than 20 languages by the time of his death.

Geisel adopted the name "Dr. Seuss" as an undergraduate at Dartmouth College and as a graduate student at Lincoln College, Oxford. He left Oxford in 1927 to begin his career as an illustrator and cartoonist for Vanity Fair, Life and various other publications. He also worked as an illustrator for advertising campaigns, most notably for FLIT and Standard Oil, and as a political cartoonist for the New York newspaper PM. He published his first children's book And to Think That I Saw It on Mulberry Street in 1937. During World War II, he took a brief hiatus from children's literature to illustrate political cartoons, and he also worked in the animation and film department of the United States Army where he wrote, produced or animated many productions including Design for Death, which later won the 1947 Academy Award for Best Documentary Feature Film.

After the war, Geisel returned to writing children's books, writing classics like If I Ran the Zoo (1950), Horton Hears a Who! (1955), The Cat in the Hat (1957), How the Grinch Stole Christmas! (1957), Green Eggs and Ham (1960), One Fish, Two Fish, Red Fish, Blue Fish (1960), The Sneetches and Other Stories (1961), The Lorax (1971), The Butter Battle Book (1984), and Oh, the Places You'll Go! (1990). He published over 60 books during his career, which have spawned numerous adaptations, including 11 television specials, five feature films, a Broadway musical, and four television series.

Geisel won the Lewis Carroll Shelf Award in 1958 for Horton Hatches the Egg and again in 1961 for And to Think That I Saw It on Mulberry Street. He received the Regina Medal award from the Catholic Library Association in 1982. Geisel's birthday, March 2, has been adopted as the annual date for National Read Across America Day, an initiative on reading created by the National Education Association. He also received two Primetime Emmy Awards for Outstanding Children's Special for Halloween Is Grinch Night (1978) and Outstanding Animated Program for The Grinch Grinches the Cat in the Hat (1982).

Life and career

Early years 

Geisel was born and raised in Springfield, Massachusetts, the son of Henrietta (née Seuss) and Theodor Robert Geisel. His father managed the family brewery and was later appointed to supervise Springfield's public park system by Mayor John A. Denison after the brewery closed because of Prohibition. Mulberry Street in Springfield, made famous in his first children's book And to Think That I Saw It on Mulberry Street, is near his boyhood home on Fairfield Street. The family was of German descent, and Geisel and his sister Marnie experienced anti-German prejudice from other children following the outbreak of World War I in 1914. Geisel was raised as a Missouri Synod Lutheran and remained in the denomination his entire life.

Geisel attended Dartmouth College, graduating in 1925. At Dartmouth, he joined the Sigma Phi Epsilon fraternity and the humor magazine Dartmouth Jack-O-Lantern, eventually rising to the rank of editor-in-chief. While at Dartmouth, he was caught drinking gin with nine friends in his room. At the time, the possession and consumption of alcohol was illegal under Prohibition laws, which remained in place between 1920 and 1933. As a result of this infraction, Dean Craven Laycock insisted that Geisel resign from all extracurricular activities, including the Jack-O-Lantern. To continue working on the magazine without the administration's knowledge, Geisel began signing his work with the pen name "Seuss". He was encouraged in his writing by professor of rhetoric W. Benfield Pressey, whom he described as his "big inspiration for writing" at Dartmouth.

Upon graduating from Dartmouth, he entered Lincoln College, Oxford, intending to earn a Doctor of Philosophy (D.Phil.) in English literature. At Oxford, he met his future wife Helen Palmer, who encouraged him to give up becoming an English teacher in favor of pursuing drawing as a career. She later recalled that "Ted's notebooks were always filled with these fabulous animals. So I set to work diverting him; here was a man who could draw such pictures; he should be earning a living doing that."

Early career
Geisel left Oxford without earning a degree and returned to the United States in February 1927, where he immediately began submitting writings and drawings to magazines, book publishers, and advertising agencies. Making use of his time in Europe, he pitched a series of cartoons called Eminent Europeans to Life magazine, but the magazine passed on it. His first nationally published cartoon appeared in the 16 July 1927, issue of The Saturday Evening Post. This single $25 sale encouraged Geisel to move from Springfield to New York City. Later that year, Geisel accepted a job as writer and illustrator at the humor magazine Judge, and he felt financially stable enough to marry Palmer. His first cartoon for Judge appeared on October 22, 1927, and Geisel and Palmer were married on November 29. Geisel's first work signed "Dr. Seuss" was published in Judge about six months after he started working there.

In early 1928, one of Geisel's cartoons for Judge mentioned Flit, a common bug spray at the time manufactured by Standard Oil of New Jersey. According to Geisel, the wife of an advertising executive in charge of advertising Flit saw Geisel's cartoon at a hairdresser's and urged her husband to sign him. Geisel's first Flit ad appeared on May 31, 1928, and the campaign continued sporadically until 1941. The campaign's catchphrase "Quick, Henry, the Flit!" became a part of popular culture. It spawned a song and was used as a punch line for comedians such as Fred Allen and Jack Benny. As Geisel gained notoriety for the Flit campaign, his work was in demand and began to appear regularly in magazines such as Life, Liberty and Vanity Fair.

The money Geisel earned from his advertising work and magazine submissions made him wealthier than even his most successful Dartmouth classmates. The increased income allowed the Geisels to move to better quarters and to socialize in higher social circles. They became friends with the wealthy family of banker Frank A. Vanderlip. They also traveled extensively: by 1936, Geisel and his wife had visited 30 countries together. They did not have children, neither kept regular office hours, and they had ample money. Geisel also felt that traveling helped his creativity.

Geisel's success with the Flit campaign led to more advertising work, including for other Standard Oil products like Essomarine boat fuel and Essolube Motor Oil and for other companies like the Ford Motor Company, NBC Radio Network, and Holly Sugar. His first foray into books, Boners, a collection of children's sayings that he illustrated, was published by Viking Press in 1931. It topped The New York Times non-fiction bestseller list and led to a sequel, More Boners, published the same year. Encouraged by the books' sales and positive critical reception, Geisel wrote and illustrated an ABC book featuring "very strange animals" that failed to interest publishers.

In 1936, Geisel and his wife were returning from an ocean voyage to Europe when the rhythm of the ship's engines inspired the poem that became his first children's book: And to Think That I Saw It on Mulberry Street. Based on Geisel's varied accounts, the book was rejected by between 20 and 43 publishers. According to Geisel, he was walking home to burn the manuscript when a chance encounter with an old Dartmouth classmate led to its publication by Vanguard Press. Geisel wrote four more books before the US entered World War II. This included The 500 Hats of Bartholomew Cubbins in 1938, as well as The King's Stilts and The Seven Lady Godivas in 1939, all of which were in prose, atypically for him. This was followed by Horton Hatches the Egg in 1940, in which Geisel returned to the use of verse.

World War II–era work

As World War II began, Geisel turned to political cartoons, drawing over 400 in two years as editorial cartoonist for the left-leaning New York City daily newspaper, PM. Geisel's political cartoons, later published in Dr. Seuss Goes to War, denounced Hitler and Mussolini and were highly critical of non-interventionists ("isolationists"), most notably Charles Lindbergh, who opposed US entry into the war. One cartoon depicted Japanese Americans being handed TNT in anticipation of a "signal from home", while other cartoons deplored the racism at home against Jews and blacks that harmed the war effort.<ref>{{Cite journal|last=Nel|first=Philip|date=2007|title=Children's Literature Goes to War: Dr. Seuss, P. D. Eastman, Munro Leaf, and the Private SNAFU Films (1943–46)|journal=The Journal of Popular Culture|language=en|volume=40|issue=3|page=478|doi=10.1111/j.1540-5931.2007.00404.x|s2cid=162293411 |issn=1540-5931|quote=For example, Seuss's support of civil rights for African Americans appears prominently in the PM cartoons he created before joining ‘‘Fort Fox.}}</ref> His cartoons were strongly supportive of President Roosevelt's handling of the war, combining the usual exhortations to ration and contribute to the war effort with frequent attacks on Congress (especially the Republican Party), parts of the press (such as the New York Daily News, Chicago Tribune and Washington Times-Herald), and others for criticism of Roosevelt, criticism of aid to the Soviet Union, investigation of suspected Communists, and other offences that he depicted as leading to disunity and helping the Nazis, intentionally or inadvertently.

In 1942, Geisel turned his energies to direct support of the U.S. war effort. First, he worked drawing posters for the Treasury Department and the War Production Board. Then, in 1943, he joined the Army as a captain and was commander of the Animation Department of the First Motion Picture Unit of the United States Army Air Forces, where he wrote films that included Your Job in Germany, a 1945 propaganda film about peace in Europe after World War II; Our Job in Japan and the Private Snafu series of adult army training films. While in the Army, he was awarded the Legion of Merit. Our Job in Japan became the basis for the commercially released film Design for Death (1947), a study of Japanese culture that won the Academy Award for Best Documentary Feature Film. Gerald McBoing-Boing (1950) was based on an original story by Seuss and won the Academy Award for Best Animated Short Film.

Later years
After the war, Geisel and his wife moved to the La Jolla community of San Diego, California, where he returned to writing children's books. He published most of his books through Random House in North America and William Collins, Sons (later HarperCollins) internationally. He wrote many, including such favorites as If I Ran the Zoo (1950), Horton Hears a Who! (1955), If I Ran the Circus (1956), The Cat in the Hat (1957), How the Grinch Stole Christmas! (1957), and Green Eggs and Ham (1960). He received numerous awards throughout his career, but he won neither the Caldecott Medal nor the Newbery Medal. Three of his titles from this period were, however, chosen as Caldecott runners-up (now referred to as Caldecott Honor books): McElligot's Pool (1947), Bartholomew and the Oobleck (1949), and If I Ran the Zoo (1950). Dr. Seuss also wrote the musical and fantasy film The 5,000 Fingers of Dr. T., which was released in 1953. The movie was a critical and financial failure, and Geisel never attempted another feature film. During the 1950s, he also published a number of illustrated short stories, mostly in Redbook magazine. Some of these were later collected (in volumes such as The Sneetches and Other Stories) or reworked into independent books (If I Ran the Zoo). A number have never been reprinted since their original appearances.

In May 1954, Life published a report on illiteracy among school children which concluded that children were not learning to read because their books were boring. William Ellsworth Spaulding was the director of the education division at Houghton Mifflin (he later became its chairman), and he compiled a list of 348 words that he felt were important for first-graders to recognize. He asked Geisel to cut the list to 250 words and to write a book using only those words. Spaulding challenged Geisel to "bring back a book children can't put down". Nine months later, Geisel completed The Cat in the Hat, using 236 of the words given to him. It retained the drawing style, verse rhythms, and all the imaginative power of Geisel's earlier works but, because of its simplified vocabulary, it could be read by beginning readers. The Cat in the Hat and subsequent books written for young children achieved significant international success and they remain very popular today. For example, in 2009, Green Eggs and Ham sold 540,000 copies, The Cat in the Hat sold 452,000 copies, and One Fish, Two Fish, Red Fish, Blue Fish (1960) sold 409,000 copies—all outselling the majority of newly published children's books.

Geisel went on to write many other children's books, both in his new simplified-vocabulary manner (sold as Beginner Books) and in his older, more elaborate style.

In 1955, Dartmouth awarded Geisel an honorary doctorate of Humane Letters, with the citation:

Geisel joked that he would now have to sign "Dr. Dr. Seuss". His wife was ill at the time, so he delayed accepting it until June 1956.

On April 28, 1958, Geisel appeared on an episode of the panel game show To Tell the Truth.

Geisel's wife Helen had a long struggle with illnesses. On October 23, 1967, Helen died by suicide. Eight months later, on June 21, 1968, Geisel married Audrey Dimond with whom he reportedly had been having an affair. Although he devoted most of his life to writing children's books, Geisel had no children of his own, saying of children: "You have 'em; I'll entertain 'em." Dimond added that Geisel "lived his whole life without children and he was very happy without children." Audrey oversaw Geisel's estate until her death on December 19, 2018, at the age of 97.

Geisel was awarded an honorary doctorate of Humane Letters (L.H.D.) from Whittier College in 1980. He also received the Laura Ingalls Wilder Medal from the professional children's librarians in 1980, recognizing his "substantial and lasting contributions to children's literature". At the time, it was awarded every five years. He won a special Pulitzer Prize in 1984 citing his "contribution over nearly half a century to the education and enjoyment of America's children and their parents".

Illness, death, and posthumous honors
Geisel died of cancer on September 24, 1991, at his home in the La Jolla community of San Diego at the age of 87. His ashes were scattered in the Pacific Ocean. On December 1, 1995, four years after his death, University of California, San Diego's University Library Building was renamed Geisel Library in honor of Geisel and Audrey for the generous contributions that they made to the library and their devotion to improving literacy.

While Geisel was living in La Jolla, the United States Postal Service and others frequently confused him with fellow La Jolla resident Dr. Hans Suess, a noted nuclear physicist.

In 2002, the Dr. Seuss National Memorial Sculpture Garden opened in Springfield, Massachusetts, featuring sculptures of Geisel and of many of his characters.

In 2017, the Amazing World of Dr. Seuss Museum opened next to the Dr. Seuss National Memorial Sculpture Garden in the Springfield Museums Quadrangle.

In 2008, Dr. Seuss was inducted into the California Hall of Fame. On March 2, 2009, the Web search engine Google temporarily changed its logo to commemorate Geisel's birthday (a practice that it often performs for various holidays and events).

In 2004, U.S. children's librarians established the annual Theodor Seuss Geisel Award to recognize "the most distinguished American book for beginning readers published in English in the United States during the preceding year". It should "demonstrate creativity and imagination to engage children in reading" from pre-kindergarten to second grade.

At Geisel's alma mater of Dartmouth, more than 90 percent of incoming first-year students participate in pre-matriculation trips run by the Dartmouth Outing Club into the New Hampshire wilderness. It is traditional for students returning from the trips to stay overnight at Dartmouth's Moosilauke Ravine Lodge, where they are served green eggs for breakfast. On April 4, 2012, the Dartmouth Medical School was renamed the Audrey and Theodor Geisel School of Medicine in honor of their many years of generosity to the college.

Dr. Seuss's honors include two Academy Awards, two Emmy Awards, a Peabody Award, the Laura Ingalls Wilder Medal, the Inkpot Award and the Pulitzer Prize.

Dr. Seuss has a star on the Hollywood Walk of Fame at the 6500 block of Hollywood Boulevard.

Dr. Seuss has been in Forbes list of the world's highest-paid dead celebrities every year since 2001, when the list was first published.

Dr. Seuss was honored with a Google Doodle in March 2, 2009 in celebration of his 105th birthday.

Pen names and pronunciations
Geisel's most famous pen name is regularly pronounced , an anglicized pronunciation inconsistent with his German surname (the standard German pronunciation is ). He himself noted that it rhymed with "voice" (his own pronunciation being ). Alexander Laing, one of his collaborators on the Dartmouth Jack-O-Lantern, wrote of it:

Geisel switched to the anglicized pronunciation because it "evoked a figure advantageous for an author of children's books to be associated with—Mother Goose" and because most people used this pronunciation. He added the "Doctor (abbreviated Dr.)" to his pen name because his father had always wanted him to practice medicine.

For books that Geisel wrote and others illustrated, he used the pen name "Theo LeSieg", starting with I Wish That I Had Duck Feet published in 1965. "LeSieg" is "Geisel" spelled backward. Geisel also published one book under the name Rosetta Stone, 1975's Because a Little Bug Went Ka-Choo!!, a collaboration with Michael K. Frith. Frith and Geisel chose the name in honor of Geisel's second wife Audrey, whose maiden name was Stone.

Political views

Geisel was a liberal Democrat and a supporter of President Franklin D. Roosevelt and the New Deal. His early political cartoons show a passionate opposition to fascism, and he urged action against it both before and after the U.S. entered World War II. His cartoons portrayed the fear of communism as overstated, finding greater threats in the House Committee on Unamerican Activities and those who threatened to cut the U.S.'s "life line" to the USSR and Stalin, whom he once depicted as a porter carrying "our war load".

Geisel supported the internment of Japanese Americans during World War II in order to prevent possible sabotage. Geisel explained his position:

After the war, Geisel overcame his feelings of animosity and  his view, using his book Horton Hears a Who! (1954) as an allegory for the American post-war occupation of Japan, as well as dedicating the book to a Japanese friend, though Ron Lamothe noted in an interview that even that book has a sense of "American chauvinism".

In 1948, after living and working in Hollywood for years, Geisel moved to La Jolla in San Diego, a predominantly Republican community.

Geisel converted a copy of one of his famous children's books, Marvin K. Mooney Will You Please Go Now!, into a polemic shortly before the end of the 1972–1974 Watergate scandal, in which U.S. president Richard Nixon resigned, by replacing the name of the main character everywhere that it occurred. "Richard M. Nixon, Will You Please Go Now!" was published in major newspapers through the column of his friend Art Buchwald.

The line "a person's a person, no matter how small!!" from Horton Hears a Who! has been used widely as a slogan by the pro-life movement in the United States. Geisel and later his widow Audrey objected to this use; according to her attorney, "She doesn't like people to hijack Dr. Seuss characters or material to front their own points of view." In the 1980s Geisel threatened to sue an anti-abortion group for using this phrase on their stationery, according to his biographer, causing them to remove it. The attorney says he never discussed abortion with either of them, and the biographer says Geisel never expressed a public opinion on the subject. After Seuss's death, Audrey gave financial support to Planned Parenthood.

In his children's books
Geisel made a point of not beginning to write his stories with a moral in mind, stating that "kids can see a moral coming a mile off." He was not against writing about issues, however; he said that "there's an inherent moral in any story", and he remarked that he was "subversive as hell."

Geisel's books express his views on a wide variety of social and political issues: The Lorax (1971), about environmentalism and anti-consumerism; The Sneetches (1961), about racial equality; The Butter Battle Book (1984), about the arms race; Yertle the Turtle (1958), about Adolf Hitler and anti-authoritarianism; How the Grinch Stole Christmas! (1957), criticizing the economic materialism and consumerism of the Christmas season; and Horton Hears a Who! (1954), about anti-isolationism and internationalism.

In recent times, Seuss's work for children has been criticized for presumably unconscious racist themes.

 Poetic meters  
Geisel wrote most of his books in anapestic tetrameter, a poetic meter employed by many poets of the English literary canon. This is often suggested as one of the reasons that Geisel's writing was so well received.

Anapestic tetrameter consists of four rhythmic units called anapests, each composed of two weak syllables followed by one strong syllable (the beat); often, the first weak syllable is omitted, or an additional weak syllable is added at the end. An example of this meter can be found in Geisel's "Yertle the Turtle", from Yertle the Turtle and Other Stories:

Some books by Geisel that are written mainly in anapestic tetrameter also contain many lines written in amphibrachic tetrameter wherein each strong syllable is surrounded by a weak syllable on each side. Here is an example from If I Ran the Circus:

Geisel also wrote verse in trochaic tetrameter, an arrangement of a strong syllable followed by a weak syllable, with four units per line (for example, the title of One Fish Two Fish Red Fish Blue Fish). Traditionally, English trochaic meter permits the final weak position in the line to be omitted, which allows both masculine and feminine rhymes.

Geisel generally maintained trochaic meter for only brief passages, and for longer stretches typically mixed it with iambic tetrameter, which consists of a weak syllable followed by a strong, and is generally considered easier to write. Thus, for example, the magicians in Bartholomew and the Oobleck make their first appearance chanting in trochees (thus resembling the witches of Shakespeare's Macbeth):

They then switch to iambs for the oobleck spell:

Artwork

Geisel's early artwork often employed the shaded texture of pencil drawings or watercolors, but in his children's books of the postwar period, he generally made use of a starker medium—pen and ink—normally using just black, white, and one or two colors. His later books, such as The Lorax, used more colors.

Geisel's style was unique—his figures are often "rounded" and somewhat droopy. This is true, for instance, of the faces of the Grinch and the Cat in the Hat. Almost all his buildings and machinery were devoid of straight lines when they were drawn, even when he was representing real objects. For example, If I Ran the Circus shows a droopy hoisting crane and a droopy steam calliope.

Geisel evidently enjoyed drawing architecturally elaborate objects, and a number of his motifs are identifiable with structures in his childhood home of Springfield, including examples such as the onion domes of its Main Street and his family's brewery. His endlessly varied but never rectilinear palaces, ramps, platforms, and free-standing stairways are among his most evocative creations. Geisel also drew complex imaginary machines, such as the Audio-Telly-O-Tally-O-Count, from Dr. Seuss's Sleep Book, or the "most peculiar machine" of Sylvester McMonkey McBean in The Sneetches. Geisel also liked drawing outlandish arrangements of feathers or fur: for example, the 500th hat of Bartholomew Cubbins, the tail of Gertrude McFuzz, and the pet for girls who like to brush and comb, in One Fish, Two Fish, Red Fish, Blue Fish.

Geisel's illustrations often convey motion vividly. He was fond of a sort of "voilà" gesture in which the hand flips outward and the fingers spread slightly backward with the thumb up. This motion is done by Ish in One Fish, Two Fish, Red Fish, Blue Fish when he creates fish (who perform the gesture with their fins), in the introduction of the various acts of If I Ran the Circus, and in the introduction of the "Little Cats" in The Cat in the Hat Comes Back. He was also fond of drawing hands with interlocked fingers, making it look as though his characters were twiddling their thumbs.

Geisel also follows the cartoon tradition of showing motion with lines, like in the sweeping lines that accompany Sneelock's final dive in If I Ran the Circus. Cartoon lines are also used to illustrate the action of the senses—sight, smell, and hearing—in The Big Brag, and lines even illustrate "thought", as in the moment when the Grinch conceives his awful plan to ruin Christmas.

Recurring images
Geisel's early work in advertising and editorial cartooning helped him to produce "sketches" of things that received more perfect realization later in his children's books. Often, the expressive use to which Geisel put an image, later on, was quite different from the original. Here are some examples:
 An editorial cartoon from July 16, 1941 depicts a whale resting on the top of a mountain as a parody of American isolationists, especially Charles Lindbergh. This was later rendered (with no apparent political content) as the Wumbus of On Beyond Zebra (1955). Seussian whales (cheerful and balloon-shaped, with long eyelashes) also occur in McElligot's Pool, If I Ran the Circus, and other books.
 Another editorial cartoon from 1941 shows a long cow with many legs and udders representing the conquered nations of Europe being milked by Adolf Hitler. This later became the Umbus of On Beyond Zebra.
 The tower of turtles in a 1942 editorial cartoon prefigures a similar tower in Yertle the Turtle. This theme also appeared in a Judge cartoon as one letter of a hieroglyphic message, and in Geisel's short-lived comic strip Hejji. Geisel once stated that Yertle the Turtle was Adolf Hitler.
 Little cats A, B, and C (as well as the rest of the alphabet) who spring from each other's hats appeared in a Ford Motor Company ad.
 The connected beards in Did I Ever Tell You How Lucky You Are? appear frequently in Geisel's work, most notably in Hejji, which featured two goats joined at the beard, The 5,000 Fingers of Dr. T., which featured two roller-skating guards joined at the beard, and a political cartoon in which Nazism and the America First movement are portrayed as "the men with the Siamese Beard".
 Geisel's earliest elephants were for advertising and had somewhat wrinkly ears, much as real elephants do. With And to Think That I Saw It on Mulberry Street! (1937) and Horton Hatches the Egg (1940), the ears became more stylized, somewhat like angel wings and thus appropriate to the saintly Horton. During World War II, the elephant image appeared as an emblem for India in four editorial cartoons. Horton and similar elephants appear frequently in the postwar children's books.
 While drawing advertisements for FLIT, Geisel became adept at drawing insects with huge stingers, shaped like a gentle S-curve and with a sharp end that included a rearward-pointing barb on its lower side. Their facial expressions depict gleeful malevolence. These insects were later rendered in an editorial cartoon as a swarm of Allied aircraft (1942), and again as the Sneedle of On Beyond Zebra, and yet again as the Skritz in I Had Trouble in Getting to Solla Sollew.
 There are many examples of creatures who arrange themselves in repeating patterns, such as the "Two and fro walkers, who march in five layers", and the Through-Horns Jumping Deer in If I Ran the Circus, and the arrangement of birds which the protagonist of Oh, the Places You'll Go! walks through, as the narrator admonishes him to "... always be dexterous and deft, and never mix up your right foot with your left."

Bibliography

 Publications 
Geisel wrote more than 60 books over the course of his long career. Most were published under his well-known pseudonym Dr. Seuss, though he also authored more than a dozen books as Theo LeSieg and one as Rosetta Stone. His books have topped many bestseller lists, sold over 600 million copies, and been translated into more than 20 languages. In 2000, Publishers Weekly compiled a list of the best-selling children's books of all time; of the top 100 hardcover books, 16 were written by Geisel, including Green Eggs and Ham, at number 4, The Cat in the Hat, at number 9, and One Fish, Two Fish, Red Fish, Blue Fish, at number 13. In the years after his death in 1991, two additional books were published based on his sketches and notes: Hooray for Diffendoofer Day! and Daisy-Head Mayzie. My Many Colored Days was originally written in 1973 but was posthumously published in 1996. In September 2011, seven stories originally published in magazines during the 1950s were released in a collection titled The Bippolo Seed and Other Lost Stories.

Geisel also wrote a pair of books for adults: The Seven Lady Godivas (1939; reprinted 1987), a retelling of the Lady Godiva legend that included nude depictions; and You're Only Old Once! (written in 1986 when Geisel was 82), which chronicles an old man's journey through a clinic. His last book was Oh, the Places You'll Go!, which was published the year before his death and became a popular gift for graduating students.

Selected titlesAnd to Think That I Saw It on Mulberry Street (1937)Horton Hatches the Egg (1940)Horton Hears a Who! (1954)The Cat in the Hat (1957)How the Grinch Stole Christmas! (1957)The Cat in the Hat Comes Back (1958)One Fish, Two Fish, Red Fish, Blue Fish (1960)Green Eggs and Ham (1960)The Sneetches and Other Stories (1961)Hop on Pop (1963)Fox in Socks (1965)The Lorax (1971)The Butter Battle Book (1981)I Am Not Going to Get Up Today! (1987)Oh, the Places You'll Go! (1990)

 Retired books 
Dr. Seuss Enterprises, the organization that owns the rights to the books, films, TV shows, stage productions, exhibitions, digital media, licensed merchandise, and other strategic partnerships, announced on March 2, 2021, that it will stop publishing and licensing six books. The publications include And to Think That I Saw It on Mulberry Street (1937), If I Ran the Zoo (1950), McElligot's Pool (1947), On Beyond Zebra! (1955), Scrambled Eggs Super! (1953) and The Cat's Quizzer (1976). According to the organization, the books "portray people in ways that are hurtful and wrong" and are no longer being published due to racist and insensitive imagery.

List of screen adaptations
Theatrical short films

Theatrical feature films

Television specials

Television series

Adaptations

For most of his career, Geisel was reluctant to have his characters marketed in contexts outside of his own books. However, he did permit the creation of several animated cartoons, an art form in which he had gained experience during World War II, and he gradually relaxed his policy as he aged.

The first adaptation of one of Geisel's works was a cartoon version of Horton Hatches the Egg, animated at Warner Bros. in 1942 and directed by Bob Clampett. It was presented as part of the Merrie Melodies series and included a number of gags not present in the original narrative, including a fish committing suicide and a Katharine Hepburn imitation by Mayzie.

As part of George Pal's Puppetoons theatrical cartoon series for Paramount Pictures, two of Geisel's works were adapted into stop-motion films by George Pal. The first, The 500 Hats of Bartholomew Cubbins, was released in 1943. The second, And to Think I Saw It on Mulberry Street, with a title slightly altered from the book's, was released in 1944. Both were nominated for an Academy Award for "Short Subject (Cartoon)".

In 1959, Geisel authorized Revell, the well-known plastic model-making company, to make a series of "animals" that snapped together rather than being glued together, and could be assembled, disassembled, and re-assembled "in thousands" of ways. The series was called the "Dr. Seuss Zoo" and included Gowdy the Dowdy Grackle, Norval the Bashful Blinket, Tingo the Noodle Topped Stroodle, and Roscoe the Many Footed Lion. The basic body parts were the same and all were interchangeable, and so it was possible for children to combine parts from various characters in essentially unlimited ways in creating their own animal characters (Revell encouraged this by selling Gowdy, Norval, and Tingo together in a "Gift Set" as well as individually). Revell also made a conventional glue-together "beginner's kit" of The Cat in the Hat.

In 1966, Geisel authorized eminent cartoon artist Chuck Jones—his friend and former colleague from the war—to make a cartoon version of How the Grinch Stole Christmas! Geisel was credited as a co-producer under his real name Ted Geisel, along with Jones. The cartoon was narrated by Boris Karloff, who also provided the voice of the Grinch. It was very faithful to the original book and is considered a classic to this day by many. It is often broadcast as an annual Christmas television special. Jones directed an adaptation of Horton Hears a Who! in 1970 and produced an adaptation of The Cat in the Hat in 1971.

From 1972 to 1983, Geisel wrote six animated specials that were produced by DePatie-Freleng: The Lorax (1972); Dr. Seuss on the Loose (1973); The Hoober-Bloob Highway (1975); Halloween Is Grinch Night (1977); Pontoffel Pock, Where Are You? (1980); and The Grinch Grinches the Cat in the Hat (1982). Several of the specials won multiple Emmy Awards.

A Soviet paint-on-glass-animated short film was made in 1986 called Welcome, an adaptation of Thidwick the Big-Hearted Moose. The last adaptation of Geisel's work before he died was The Butter Battle Book, a television special based on the book of the same name, directed by Ralph Bakshi.

A television film titled In Search of Dr. Seuss was released in 1994, which adapted many of Seuss's stories. It uses both live-action versions and animated versions of the characters and stories featured; however, the animated portions were merely edited versions of previous animated television specials and, in some cases, re-dubbed as well.

After Geisel died of cancer at the age of 87 in 1991, his widow Audrey Geisel took charge of licensing matters until her death in 2018. Since then, licensing is controlled by the nonprofit Dr. Seuss Enterprises. Audrey approved a live-action feature-film version of How the Grinch Stole Christmas starring Jim Carrey, as well as a Seuss-themed Broadway musical called Seussical, and both premiered in 2000. The Grinch has had limited engagement runs on Broadway during the Christmas season, after premiering in 1998 (under the title How the Grinch Stole Christmas) at the Old Globe Theatre in San Diego, where it has become a Christmas tradition. In 2003, another live-action film was released, this time an adaptation of The Cat in the Hat that featured Mike Myers as the title character. Audrey Geisel spoke critically of the film, especially the casting of Myers as the Cat in the Hat, and stated that she would not allow any further live-action adaptations of Geisel's books. However, a first animated CGI feature film adaptation of Horton Hears a Who! was approved, and was eventually released on March 14, 2008, to positive reviews. A second CGI-animated feature film adaptation of The Lorax was released by Universal on March 2, 2012 (on what would have been Seuss's 108th birthday). The third adaptation of Seuss's story, the CGI-animated feature film, The Grinch, was released by Universal on November 9, 2018.

Five television series have been adapted from Geisel's work. The first, Gerald McBoing-Boing, was an animated television adaptation of Geisel's 1951 cartoon of the same name and lasted three months between 1956 and 1957. The second, The Wubbulous World of Dr. Seuss, was a mix of live-action and puppetry by Jim Henson Television, the producers of The Muppets. It aired for two seasons on Nickelodeon in the United States, from 1996 to 1998. The third, Gerald McBoing-Boing, is a remake of the 1956 series. Produced in Canada by Cookie Jar Entertainment (now DHX Media) and North America by Classic Media (now DreamWorks Classics), it ran from 2005 to 2007. The fourth, The Cat in the Hat Knows a Lot About That!, produced by Portfolio Entertainment Inc., began on August 7, 2010, in Canada and September 6, 2010, in the United States and is producing new episodes . The fifth, Green Eggs and Ham, is an animated streaming television adaptation of Geisel's 1960 book of the same title and premiered on November 8, 2019, on Netflix, and a second season by the title of Green Eggs and Ham: The Second Serving is scheduled to premiere in 2021.

Geisel's books and characters are also featured in Seuss Landing, one of many islands at the Islands of Adventure theme park in Orlando, Florida. In an attempt to match Geisel's visual style, there are reported "no straight lines" in Seuss Landing.The Hollywood Reporter has reported that Warner Animation Group and Dr. Seuss Enterprises have struck a deal to make new animated movies based on the stories of Dr. Seuss. Their first project will be a fully animated version of The Cat in the Hat.

 See also 

 The Cat in the Hat (play)
 "The Sidewinder Sleeps Tonite" – a 1992 R.E.M. song referencing a reading from Seuss.
 Origins of a StoryReferences

Further reading
 
 
 
 
 
 
 
 
 
  Documentary aired on the Public Television System.
 
 
 
 
 
 
 

External links

 Seussville site Random House
 
 Dr. Seuss at Internet Off-Broadway Database
 Dr. Seuss biography on Lambiek Comiclopedia
 Dr. Seuss Went to War: A Catalog of Political Cartoons by Dr. Seuss
 The Advertising Artwork of Dr. Seuss
 The Register of Dr. Seuss Collection UC San Diego
 
 Dr. Seuss / Theodor Geisel artwork can be viewed at American Art Archives web site
 
 The Dr. Seuss That Switched His Voice – poem by Joe Dolce, first published in Quadrant'' magazine.
 Register of the Dr. Seuss Collection, UC San Diego

 
 Theodor Seuss Geisel (real name), Theo. LeSieg (pseud.), and Rosetta Stone (joint pseud.) at LC Authorities with 30, 9, and 1 records

 

 
1904 births
1991 deaths
20th-century American male writers
20th-century American poets
20th-century American screenwriters
20th-century pseudonymous writers
Alumni of Lincoln College, Oxford
American anti-fascists
American children's book illustrators
American children's writers
American editorial cartoonists
American illustrators
American male poets
American people of German descent
Articles containing video clips
Artists from Springfield, Massachusetts
Childfree
Children's poets
Dartmouth College alumni
Deaths from cancer in California
Deaths from oral cancer
First Motion Picture Unit personnel
Inkpot Award winners
Laura Ingalls Wilder Medal winners
Massachusetts Democrats
Military personnel from Massachusetts
People from La Jolla, San Diego
Poets from California
Poets from Massachusetts
Primetime Emmy Award winners
Pulitzer Prize winners
RCA Records artists
Recipients of the Legion of Merit
Screenwriters from Massachusetts
United States Army Air Forces officers
Warner Bros. Cartoons people
Writers from Springfield, Massachusetts
Writers who illustrated their own writing